Magdalena Treitschke (1788-1816) was an Austrian ballet dancer. She was engaged at the Burgtheater in 1802-1811 and internationally famous in her time.

References 

1788 births
1816 deaths
19th-century Austrian ballet dancers
Austrian ballerinas